El Raja Sporting Club, simply known as El Raja, is an Egyptian football and sports club based in Mersa Matruh, Egypt. The club currently plays in the Egyptian Second Division, the second-highest league in the Egyptian football league system. It was promoted for the first time to the Premier League in the 2012-13 season.

Current squad
Egyptian Football Association (EFA) rules are that a team may only have 3 foreign born players in the squad.

External links
El Raja SC at Soccerway

Egyptian Second Division
1999 establishments in Egypt
Football clubs in Egypt
Sports clubs in Egypt